The list of German Type II submarines includes all Type II submarines (Unterseeboot or U-boat) built by Germany.

Type IIA

U 1 
 Builder:  Deutsche Werke AG at Kiel
 Laid down:  11 February 1935
 Commissioned:  29 June 1935
 Operations:  2 patrols
 Victories:  None
 Fate:  Sunk 6 April 1940 by a mine in the North Sea

U 2 
 Builder:  Deutsche Werke AG at Kiel
 Laid down:  11 February 1935
 Commissioned:  25 July 1935
 Operations:  2 patrols, served with Unterseebootschulflottille and 21. Unterseebootflottille
 Victories:  None
 Fate:  Sunk 8 April 1944 from collision with Helmi Söhle near Pillau in the Baltic Sea

U 3 
 Builder:  Deutsche Werke AG at Kiel
 Laid down:  11 February 1935
 Commissioned:  6 September 1935
 Operations:  5 patrols, served with Unterseebootschulflottille and 21. Unterseebootflottille
 Victories:  2 merchant ships (total of )
 Fate:  Stricken 1 August 1944 and scrapped

U 4 
 Builder:  Deutsche Werke AG at Kiel
 Laid down:  11 February 1935
 Commissioned:  17 August 1935
 Operations:  4 patrols, served with Unterseebootschulflottille and 21. Unterseebootflottille
 Victories:  3 merchant ships (total of ) and 1 warship (1,090 tons)
 Fate:  Stricken 1 August 1944 and scrapped

U 5 
 Builder:  Deutsche Werke AG at Kiel
 Laid down:  11 February 1935
 Commissioned:  31 August 1935
 Operations:  2 patrols, served with Unterseebootschulflottille and 21. Unterseebootflottille
 Victories:  None
 Fate:  Sunk 19 March 1943 in diving accident near Pillau in the Baltic Sea

U 6 
 Builder:  Deutsche Werke AG at Kiel
 Laid down:  11 February 1935
 Commissioned:  7 September 1935
 Operations:  2 patrols, served with Unterseebootschulflottille and 21. Unterseebootflottille
 Victories:  None
 Fate:  Stricken 7 August 1944

Type IIB

U 7 
 Builder:  Germaniawerft at Kiel
 Laid down:  11 March 1935
 Commissioned:  18 July 1935
 Operations:  6 patrols, served with Unterseebootschulflottille and 21. Unterseebootflottille
 Victories:  2 ships totalling 
 Fate:  Sunk 18 February 1944 in diving accident near Pillau in the Baltic Sea

U 8 
 Builder:  Germaniawerft at Kiel
 Laid down:  25 March 1935
 Commissioned:  5 August 1935
 Operations:  1 patrol, served with Unterseebootschulflottille, U-Abwehrschule and 1. Unterseebootflottille, 22. Unterseebootflottille, and 24. Unterseebootflottille
 Victories:  None
 Fate:  Scuttled 5 May 1945 at Wilhelmshaven

U 9 
 Builder:  Germaniawerft at Kiel
 Laid down:  8 April 1935
 Commissioned:  21 August 1935
 Operations:  19 patrols, served with 1. Unterseebootflottille, 21. Unterseebootflottille, 24. Unterseebootflottille, and 30. Unterseebootflottille
 Victories:  7 merchant ships totaling  and 1 warship (552 tons) plus 1 ship damaged totaling 412 tons
 Fate:  Sunk 20 August 1944 by Soviet aircraft at Constanţa in the Black Sea, raised by the Soviets as TS-16

U 10 
 Builder:  Germaniawerft at Kiel
 Laid down:  22 April 1935
 Commissioned:  9 September 1935
 Operations:  5 patrols, served with Unterseebootschulflottille, 1. Unterseebootflottille, 3. Unterseebootflottille, and 21. Unterseebootflottille
 Victories:  2 ships totaling 
 Fate:  Stricken 1 August 1944

U 11 
 Builder:  Germaniawerft at Kiel
 Laid down:  6 May 1935
 Commissioned:  21 September 1935
 Operations:  Served with Unterseebootschulflottille, 1. Unterseebootflottille, 5. Unterseebootflottille, 21. Unterseebootflottille, and 22. Unterseebootflottille
 Victories:  None
 Fate:  Stricken 5 January 1945

U 12 
 Builder:  Germaniawerft at Kiel
 Laid down:  20 May 1935
 Commissioned:  30 September 1935
 Operations:  2 patrols, served with 3. Unterseebootflottille
 Victories:  None
 Fate:  Sunk 8 October 1939 after a mine hit near Dover in the English Channel
The wrecksite of U-12 is designated as a protected place under the Protection of Military Remains Act.  U-12 was the vessel nominated by the German authorities to represent all U-boats sunk in British waters in the second world war.

U 13 
 Builder:  Deutsche Werke AG at Kiel
 Laid down:  20 June 1935
 Commissioned:  30 November 1935
 Operations:  9 patrols, served with 1. Unterseebootflottille
 Victories:  9 ships totaling  plus 3 ships damaged totaling 
 Fate:  Sunk 31 May 1940 by the Royal Navy sloop HMS Weston

U 14 
 Builder:  Deutsche Werke AG at Kiel
 Laid down:  6 July 1935
 Commissioned:  18 January 1936
 Operations:  6 patrols, served with 3. Unterseebootflottille, 22. Unterseebootflottille, 24. Unterseebootflottille, UnterseeAusbildungsflottille, and 1. UnterseeAusbildungsflottille
 Victories:  9 ships totaling 
 Fate:  Scuttled 5 May 1945 at Wilhelmshaven

U 15 
 Builder:  Deutsche Werke AG at Kiel
 Laid down:  24 September 1935
 Commissioned:  7 March 1936
 Operations:  5 patrols, served with 1. Unterseebootflottille
 Victories:  3 ships
 Fate:  Sunk 30 January 1940 in collision with torpedo boat Iltis in the Hoofden

U 16 
 Builder:  Deutsche Werke AG at Kiel
 Laid down:  5 August 1935
 Commissioned:  16 May 1936
 Operations:  3 patrols, served with 3. Unterseebootflottille
 Victories:  2 ships
 Fate:  Sunk 25 October 1939 by the Royal Navy trawler HMS Cayton Wyke and patrol vessel HMS Puffin

U 17 
 Builder:  Germaniawerft at Kiel
 Laid down:  1 July 1935
 Commissioned:  3 December 1935
 Operations:  4 patrols, served with 1. Unterseebootflottille, 22. Unterseebootflottille, UnterseeAusbildungsflottille, and 1. UnterseeAusbildungsflottille
 Victories:  3 ships
 Fate:  Scuttled 5 May 1945 at Wilhelmshaven

U 18 
 Builder:  Germaniawerft at Kiel
 Laid down:  10 July 1935
 Commissioned:  4 January 1936
 Operations:  14 patrols, served with 1. Unterseebootflottille, 3. Unterseebootflottille, 24. Unterseebootflottille, 30. Unterseebootflottille, UnterseeAusbildungsflottille, and 1. UnterseeAusbildungsflottille
 Victories:  3 ships plus 2 damaged ( and 56 tons)
 Fate:  Scuttled 25 August 1944 at Constanţa in the Black Sea

U 19 
 Builder:  Germaniawerft at Kiel
 Laid down:  20 July 1935
 Commissioned:  16 January 1936
 Operations:  20 patrols, served with 1. Unterseebootflottille, 22. Unterseebootflottille, 24. Unterseebootflottille, 30. Unterseebootflottille, and 1. UnterseeAusbildungsflottille
 Victories:  15 ships ( and 441 tons)
 Fate:  Scuttled 11 September 1944 near Turkey in the Black Sea

U 20 
 Builder:  Germaniawerft at Kiel
 Laid down:  1 August 1935
 Commissioned:  1 February 1936
 Operations:  16 patrols, served with 1. Unterseebootflottille, 3. Unterseebootflottille, 21. Unterseebootflottille, 30. Unterseebootflottille, and 1. UnterseeAusbildungsflottille
 Victories:  13 ships and 9 tons plus 3 damaged
 Fate:  Scuttled 10 September 1944 near Turkey in the Black Sea

U 21 
 Builder:  Germaniawerft at Kiel
 Laid down:  4 March 1936
 Commissioned:  3 August 1936
 Operations:  7 patrols, served with 1. Unterseebootflottille and 21. Unterseebootflottille
 Victories:  6 ships plus 1 damaged (11,500 tons)
 Fate:  Interned by Norway 27 March to 9 April 1940, stricken 5 August 1944 and scrapped

U 22 
 Builder:  Germaniawerft at Kiel
 Laid down:  4 March 1936
 Commissioned:  20 August 1936
 Operations:  7 patrols, served with 1. Unterseebootflottille and 3. Unterseebootflottille
 Victories:  9 ships and 1,475 tons
 Fate:  Went missing 27 March 1940 in the Skagerrak

U 23 
 Builder:  Germaniawerft at Kiel
 Laid down:  11 April 1936
 Commissioned:  24 September 1936
 Operations:  16 patrols, served with 1. Unterseebootflottille, 21. Unterseebootflottille, and 30. Unterseebootflottille
 Victories:  12 ships and 1,410 tons
 Fate:  Scuttled 10 September 1944 near Turkey in the Black Sea

U 24 
 Builder:  Germaniawerft at Kiel
 Laid down:  21 April 1936
 Commissioned:  10 October 1936
 Operations:  19 patrols, served with 1. Unterseebootflottille, 3. Unterseebootflottille, 21. Unterseebootflottille, 30. Unterseebootflottille, and 1. UnterseeAusbildungsflottille
 Victories:  7 ships and 573 tons plus 1 damaged
 Fate:  Scuttled 25 August 1944 at Constanţa on the Black Sea

U 120 
 Builder:  Flender Werke AG at Lübeck
 Laid down:  31 March 1938
 Commissioned:  20 April 1940
 Operations:  Served with 21. Unterseebootflottille, 31. Unterseebootflottille, and Unterseebootschulflottille
 Victories:  None
 Fate:  Scuttled 5 May 1945 at Bremerhaven, raised 1950 and scrapped

U 121 
 Builder:  Flender Werke AG at Lübeck
 Laid down:  16 April 1938
 Commissioned:  28 May 1940
 Operations:  Served with 21. Unterseebootflottille, 24. Unterseebootflottille, 31. Unterseebootflottille, and Unterseebootschulflottille
 Victories:  None
 Fate:  Scuttled 5 May 1945 at Bremerhaven, raised 1950 and scrapped

Type IIC

U 56 
 Builder:  Deutsche Werke AG at Kiel
 Laid down:  21 September 1937
 Commissioned:  26 November 1938
 Operations:  12 patrols, served with 1. Unterseebootflottille, 5. Unterseebootflottille, 19. Unterseebootflottille, 22. Unterseebootflottille, and 24. Unterseebootflottille
 Victories:  4 ships
 Fate: Scuttled on 3 May 1945

U 57 
 Builder:  Deutsche Werke AG at Kiel
 Laid down:  14 September 1937
 Commissioned:  29 December 1938
 Operations:  11 patrols, served with 1. Unterseebootflottille, 5. Unterseebootflottille, 19. Unterseebootflottille, and 22. Unterseebootflottille
 Victories:  13 ships plus 2 damaged
 Fate:  Scuttled 3 May 1945 at Kiel

U 58 
 Builder:  Deutsche Werke AG at Kiel
 Laid down:  29 September 1937
 Commissioned:  4 February 1939
 Operations:  12 patrols, served with 1. Unterseebootflottille, 5. Unterseebootflottille, 19. Unterseebootflottille, and 22. Unterseebootflottille
 Victories:  7 ships
 Fate:  Scuttled 3 May 1945 at Kiel

U 59 
 Builder:  Deutsche Werke AG at Kiel
 Laid down:  5 October 1937
 Commissioned:  4 March 1939
 Operations:  13 patrols, served with 1. Unterseebootflottille, 5. Unterseebootflottille, 19. Unterseebootflottille, and 22. Unterseebootflottille
 Victories:  20 ships
 Fate:  Stricken April 1945, scuttled and scrapped

U 60 
 Builder:  Deutsche Werke AG at Kiel
 Laid down:  1 October 1938
 Commissioned:  22 July 1939
 Operations:  9 patrols, served with 1. Unterseebootflottille, 5. Unterseebootflottille, and 21. Unterseebootflottille
 Victories:  3 ships plus 1 damaged
 Fate:  Scuttled 5 May 1945 at Wilhelmshaven

U 61 
 Builder:  Deutsche Werke AG at Kiel
 Laid down:  1 October 1938
 Commissioned:  12 August 1939
 Operations:  10 patrols, served with 1. Unterseebootflottille, 5. Unterseebootflottille, and 21. Unterseebootflottille
 Victories:  5 ships plus 1 damaged
 Fate:  Scuttled 5 May 1945 at Wilhelmshaven

U 62 
 Builder:  Deutsche Werke AG at Kiel
 Laid down:  2 January 1939
 Commissioned:  21 December 1939
 Operations:  5 patrols, served with 1. Unterseebootflottille, 5. Unterseebootflottille, and 21. Unterseebootflottille
 Victories:  2 ships ( and 1,350 tons)
 Fate:  Scuttled 5 May 1945 at Wilhelmshaven

U 63 
 Builder:  Deutsche Werke AG at Kiel
 Laid down:  2 January 1939
 Commissioned:  18 January 1940
 Operations:  1 patrol, served with 1. Unterseebootflottille
 Victories:  1 ship
 Fate:  Sunk 25 February 1940 near the Shetland Islands in the North Sea by Royal Navy destroyers Escort, Inglefield, and Imogen, and the submarine Narwhal

Type IID

U 137 
 Builder:  Deutsche Werke AG at Kiel
 Laid down:  16 November 1939
 Commissioned:  15 June 1940
 Operations:  4 patrols, served with 1. Unterseebootflottille and 22. Unterseebootflottille
 Victories:  6 ships plus 2 damaged
 Fate:  Scuttled 5 May 1945 at Wilhelmshaven

U 138 
 Builder:  Deutsche Werke AG at Kiel
 Laid down:  16 November 1939
 Commissioned:  27 June 1940
 Operations:  5 patrols, served with 1. Unterseebootflottille, 3. Unterseebootflottille, and 22. Unterseebootflottille
 Victories:  6 ships plus 1 damaged
 Fate:  Scuttled 18 June 1941 near Cadiz, Spain in the Atlantic Ocean after being damaged by the Royal Navy destroyers HMS Faulknor, HMS Fearless, HMS Forester, HMS Foresight and HMS Foxhound.

U 139 
 Builder:  Deutsche Werke AG at Kiel
 Laid down:  20 November 1939
 Commissioned:  24 July 1940
 Operations:  Served with 1. Unterseebootflottille, 21. Unterseebootflottille, and 22. Unterseebootflottille
 Victories:  None
 Fate:  Scuttled 5 May 1945 at Wilhelmshaven

U 140 
 Builder:  Deutsche Werke AG at Kiel
 Laid down:  16 November 1939
 Commissioned:  7 August 1940
 Operations:  3 patrols, served with 1. Unterseebootflottille, 22. Unterseebootflottille, and 31. Unterseebootflottille
 Victories:  4 ships ( and 206 tons)
 Fate:  Scuttled 5 May 1945 at Wilhelmshaven, later scrapped

U 141 
 Builder:  Deutsche Werke AG at Kiel
 Laid down:  12 December 1939
 Commissioned:  21 August 1940
 Operations:  4 patrols, served with 1. Unterseebootflottille, 3. Unterseebootflottille, 21. Unterseebootflottille, and 31. Unterseebootflottille
 Victories:  4 ships plus 1 damaged
 Fate:  Scuttled 5 May 1945 at Wilhelmshaven, later scrapped

U 142 
 Builder:  Deutsche Werke AG at Kiel
 Laid down:  12 December 1939
 Commissioned:  4 September 1940
 Operations:  3 patrols, served with 1. Unterseebootflottille, 5. Unterseebootflottille, 22. Unterseebootflottille, and 24. Unterseebootflottille
 Victories:  None
 Fate:  Scuttled 5 May 1945 at Wilhelmshaven, later scrapped

U 143 
 Builder:  Deutsche Werke AG at Kiel
 Laid down:  3 January 1940
 Commissioned:  18 September 1940
 Operations:  4 patrols, served with 1. Unterseebootflottille, 3. Unterseebootflottille, 22. Unterseebootflottille, and 24. Unterseebootflottille
 Victories:  1 ship
 Fate:  Surrendered to the Allies 30 June 1945 for Operation Deadlight, sunk 22 December 1945

U 144 
 Builder:  Deutsche Werke AG at Kiel
 Laid down:  10 January 1940
 Commissioned:  2 October 1940
 Operations:  3 patrols, served with 1. Unterseebootflottille, and 22. Unterseebootflottille
 Victories:  1 ship (206 tons)
 Fate:  Sunk 10 August 1941 near Hiiumaa (Dagö) in the Gulf of Finland by Soviet Navy submarine Щ-307

U 145 
 Builder:  Deutsche Werke AG at Kiel
 Laid down:  29 March 1940
 Commissioned:  16 October 1940
 Operations:  3 patrols, served with 1. Unterseebootflottille, and 22. Unterseebootflottille
 Victories:  None
 Fate:  Surrendered to the Allies 5 May 1945 for Operation Deadlight, sunk 22 December 1945

U 146 
 Builder:  Deutsche Werke AG at Kiel
 Laid down:  30 March 1940
 Commissioned:  30 October 1940
 Operations:  2 patrols, served with 1. Unterseebootflottille, 3. Unterseebootflottille, and 22. Unterseebootflottille
 Victories:  1 ship
 Fate:  Scuttled 5 May 1945 at Wilhelmshaven

U 147 
 Builder:  Deutsche Werke AG at Kiel
 Laid down:  10 April 1940
 Commissioned:  11 December 1940
 Operations:  3 patrols, served with 1. Unterseebootflottille, 3. Unterseebootflottille, and 22. Unterseebootflottille
 Victories:  3 ships plus 1 damaged
 Fate:  Sunk 2 June 1941 near Ireland in the Atlantic Ocean, by the Royal Navy destroyer  and corvette Periwinkle

U 148 
 Builder:  Deutsche Werke AG at Kiel
 Laid down:  10 April 1940
 Commissioned:  28 December 1940
 Operations:  Served with 21. Unterseebootflottille, 24. Unterseebootflottille, and 31. Unterseebootflottille
 Victories:  None
 Fate:  Scuttled 5 May 1945 at Wilhelmshaven, later scrapped

U 149 
 Builder:  Deutsche Werke AG at Kiel
 Laid down:  25 May 1940
 Commissioned:  13 November 1940
 Operations:  1 patrol, served with 1. Unterseebootflottille and 22. Unterseebootflottille
 Victories:  1 ship (206 tons)
 Fate:  Surrendered to the Allies 5 May 1945 for Operation Deadlight, sunk 22 December 1945

U 150 
 Builder:  Deutsche Werke AG at Kiel
 Laid down:  25 May 1940
 Commissioned:  27 November 1940
 Operations:  Served with 1. Unterseebootflottille, 22. Unterseebootflottille, and 31. Unterseebootflottille
 Victories:  None
 Fate:  Surrendered to the Allies on 5 May 1945 at Wilhelmshaven

U 151 
 Builder:  Deutsche Werke AG at Kiel
 Laid down:  6 July 1940
 Commissioned:  15 January 1941
 Operations:  Served with 21. Unterseebootflottille, 24. Unterseebootflottille, and 31. Unterseebootflottille
 Victories:  None
 Fate:  Scuttled 5 May 1945 at Wilhelmshaven

U 152 
 Builder:  Deutsche Werke AG at Kiel
 Laid down:  6 July 1940
 Commissioned:  29 January 1941
 Operations:  Served with 21. Unterseebootflottille, 24. Unterseebootflottille, and 31. Unterseebootflottille
 Victories:  None
 Fate:  Scuttled 5 May 1945 at Wilhelmshaven, later scrapped

See also 
 List of Kriegsmarine ships
 List of naval ships of Germany
 List of World War II ships of less than 1000 tons

German Type II submarines